A Wall of Silence is a 1993 Argentine drama film starring Vanessa Redgrave. The film concerns a turbulent period in Argentine history, the National Reorganization Process as well as the responsibility of artists in engaging and interpreting human stories from this period. It was directed by Lita Stantic and released theatrically in Argentina on 10 June 1993. It was also screened later that year at the Toronto International Film Festival. It was released as Black Flowers in some English territories.

Plot
Kate (Redgrave) is a British film director on location in Argentina that traces the story of Silvia (Medina). Silvia has a dark past, stemming from the turbulent time when she endured her husband's forced disappearance during the Dirty War. Silvia wants to move on with her life and concentrate on her family. But she is eventually persuaded into reliving her painful past.

Cast
Vanessa Redgrave as Kate Benson
Ofelia Medina as Silvia
Lautaro Murúa as Bruno
Lorenzo Quinteros
Soledad Villamil as Ana-Laura
André Melançon
Julio Chávez as Julio-Patricio
Graciela Araujo

Production
Stantic had the idea for the film as early as 1986 after an experience of working with the British actress, Julie Christie on Miss Mary. Christie  revealed to Stantic her personal experiences of having set up her life in Argentina with the intention of discovering the recent past.

It was subsequently filmed in Buenos Aires in 1992. It is a co-production between Argentina's Aleph Producciones, Britain's Channel 4 and Mexico's  Instituto Mexicano de Cinematografía (IMCINE).

Reception
The film was generally well-received, proving to be a success with Argentine film critics. Although this was a period when Argentine film audiences were more enthralled with viewing politics through the gaze of melodrama and rock music. Redgrave was praised for her performance, especially for the striking similarities betweens her character and her real-life persona as supporter of sometimes unpopular minority causes.

References

External links
 

1993 films
1990s political drama films
1990s Spanish-language films
Argentine films based on actual events
British films based on actual events
Dirty War films
Enforced disappearance
Films shot in Argentina
Films set in Argentina
Argentine drama films
British drama films
Mexican drama films
Films about filmmaking
Film4 Productions films
Films shot in Buenos Aires
Films set in Buenos Aires
1993 drama films
1990s British films
1990s Mexican films